Kushkuiyeh (also Romanized as Kūshkū’īyeh; also known as Kashkū’īyeh) is a village in Saghder Rural District, Jebalbarez District, Jiroft County, Kerman Province, Iran. At the 2006 census, its population was 54, in 14 families.

References 

Populated places in Jiroft County